The Sognefjord or Sognefjorden, nicknamed the King of the Fjords, is the largest and deepest fjord in Norway.

The fjord gives its name to the surrounding district of Sogn. The name is related to Norwegian word súg- "to suck",  presumably from the surge or suction of the tidal currents at the mouth of the fjord.

Geography

The fjord runs through many municipalities: Solund, Gulen, Hyllestad, Høyanger, Vik, Sogndal, Lærdal, Aurland, Årdal, and Luster. Thresholds occur in an area with sounds, valleys, and low land where the glacier was allowed spread out and lose its erosive effect.

The inner part has extensive tributary fjords such as Aurlandsfjorden, while the outer part is connected by narrow sounds to neighbouring fjords. Near the coast the fjord mouth is bounded largely by low islands and skerries that are part of the strandflat.

Thus the climate of the inner end of Sognefjorden and its branches are not as wet as on the outer coastline. Hurrungane range at the eastern end of the fjord reaches . The greatest elevation from seabed to summit is at Sogndal. Several rivers pour fresh water into the fjord with an annual "spring" flood in June. The mouth of the fjord is surrounded by many islands including Sula, Losna, and Hiserøyna. The Sognefjord cuts through a northwestern gneiss area with a south-west to north-east structure, and penetrates the Caledonian fold through in the inner part. There is no clear relation between the east–west direction of the main fjord and the fold patterns of the bedrock, while some of tributary fjords in the parts corresponds to fold pattern.

Branches
There are many smaller fjords which branch off the main fjord.
 Sognesjøen (mouth), 
 Lifjorden, 
 Høyangsfjord, 
 Arnafjord, 
 Esefjord, 
 Fjærlandsfjord, 
 Sogndalsfjord, 
 Aurlandsfjord, 
 Nærøyfjord (a World Heritage Site), 
 Lærdalsfjord, 
 Årdalsfjord, 
 Lustrafjord (innermost),

Lustrafjorden
The innermost arm of the Sognefjorden is called the Lustrafjord, in the municipality of Luster. At its end is the village of Skjolden, which is an access point to Jotunheimen National Park. In earlier times, transport between Bergen and the Scandinavian inland was by boat between Bergen and Skjolden and from there on a simple road over the highlands (today Norwegian County Road 55), or by boat to Lærdal and through the mountain pass to Valdres (now European route E16).

Origin and geology
The valley of Sognefjord is one of various valleys of western Norway that certainly predates the Quaternary glaciations. It existed already as part of the ancient Paleic surface but had at the time much gentler slopes. The fjords of western Norway formed in connection to the east-ward tilting of much of Norway during the Cenozoic uplift of the Scandinavian Mountains. This uplift, that occurred long before the Quaternary glaciations, enabled rivers to incise deeply the Paleic relief. An estimate of 7610 km3 of rock has been eroded from the Sognefjord drainage basin since the Paleic surface formed. The fluvial and glacial erosion that made the fjords has followed structural weaknesses in the crust.

During the last glaciation the ice reached a maximum thickness of nearly 3000 meters in the Sognefjord area. Confluence of tributary fjords led excavation of the deepest fjord basin. Until about 30 km from the very coast the Sognefjord glacier was apparently constricted to its narrow channel of homogeneous gneiss, then the glacier suddenly spread out presumably through sounds and low valleys.

Tourism

Boats connect settlements along the fjord and its sidearms. Larger villages on the fjord and its branches include Leirvik, Ytre Oppedal, Vadheim, Høyanger, Vikøyri, Balestrand, Hermansverk, Sogndalsfjøra, Gudvangen, Flåm, Aurlandsvangen, Lærdalsøyri, Årdalstangen, Gaupne and Solvorn. Together with the Geirangerfjord in Møre og Romsdal, the Nærøyfjord is a UNESCO World Heritage Site. From the village of Flåm, the Flåm Railway climbs  up to Myrdal Station in a distance of only —the steepest unassisted railway climb in the world.

Around the inner end of the fjord, three of Norway's famous stave churches have survived: Kaupanger and Urnes (along the shoreline) and Borgund ( into the Lærdal valley).

This is the second largest span of power lines in the world. The fjord has become a tourist attraction with summer tourists being an important part of the local economy.

Transport
There is a plan to build a road across the Sognefjord, crossing through a submerged tube in mid-water anchored to floats. This will avoid storms on the surface, and will not have to go over a kilometer deep to get below the bed of the fjord.

There are many ferry crossings of the Sognefjord. One of the ferryboats that traverses this fjord is the MV Ampere, the world's first battery-electric car ferry, which crosses the fjord between the towns of Lavik and Ytre Oppedal.

Other
 On 24 November 1972, the submarine KNM Sklinna of the Royal Norwegian Navy had "contact" with what they presumed was a Russian Whiskey-class submarine after a 14-day pursuit in the Sognefjorden. Military documents released later confirm this episode.

See also 
 List of Norwegian fjords

References

External links

 www.sognefjord.no
 Flåmsbana information
 Art of the States: Bright Days of Little Sunlight musical work inspired by the Sognefjord
 Google Earth view of the Sognefjord

 
Fjords of Vestland